Pietro Pianta (2 October 1940 – 18 January 2015) was an Italian football goalkeeper and manager.

Born in Pontelongo, in 1958 Pietro Pianta played as a goalkeeper for Calcio Padova, Anconitana, Atalanta B.C., U.S. Cremonese and  Vicenza Calcio. After his playing career, he had a career as a goalkeeper coach in Calcio Como and U.S. Cremonese.

References

1940 births
2015 deaths
Italian footballers
Serie A players
L.R. Vicenza players
Atalanta B.C. players
U.S. Cremonese players
Calcio Padova players
Serie B players
Sportspeople from the Province of Padua
Association football defenders
Footballers from Veneto